Max Dearly (22 November 1874 - 2 June 1943) was a French stage and film actor.

Dearly was born Lucien Paul Marie-Joseph Rolland in Paris, and died in Neuilly-sur-Seine 1943.

Partial filmography

 Le bonheur sous la main (1911)
 Coquecigrole (1931) - Macarol
 Tossing Ship (1932) - Le député Puy-Pradal
 Azaïs (1932) - Baron Wurtz
 Love and Luck (1932) - Jeff Chester
 Madame Bovary (1934) - Homais
 Les Misérables (1934) - M. Gillenormand
 Arlette et ses papas (1934) - Mérové
 The Last Billionaire (1934) - Banco
 Si j'étais le patron (1934) - M. Maubert
 A Rare Bird (1935) - Melleville
 Paris Camargue (1935) - Jules Fabrejoul
 La Vie parisienne (1936) - Ramiro Mendoza
 Parisian Life (1936) - Don Ramiro de Mendoza
 La reine des resquilleuses (1937) - John
 Claudine at School (1937) - Le père de Claudine
 Le coeur ébloui (1938) - Géodésias
 The Train for Venice (1938) - M. Chardonne
 Le grand élan (1939) - Barsac
 Nine Bachelors (1939) - Athanase Outriquet
 Claudine (1940)
 Bécassine (1940) - Monsieur Adhémar de Proey-Minans
 Le club des soupirants (1941) - Le prince Nirvanoff (final film role)

References

External links

1874 births
1943 deaths
Male actors from Paris
French male film actors
French male stage actors
20th-century French male actors